Dorothy Inglis (15 April 1926 – 22 May 2013) was a Canadian feminist, activist and author born in Calgary, Alberta, and raised in Vancouver, British Columbia. She spent most of her adulthood in Newfoundland.

Political roles
Inglis was active in advocating for women's rights. She was a founding member of St. John's Status of Women Council and the Newfoundland Status of Women Council, and served on the National Action Committee on the Status of Women from 1982 until 1986, acting as vice-president from 1984. In 1988 she represented Canadian Voice of Women for Peace as a delegate to the 1988 Conference on Disarmament. She also had leadership roles in the Newfoundland and Labrador New Democratic Party.

For eight years she wrote the feminist column for The Telegram in St. John's. In 1996, Killick Press published a selection of 58 of her columns in a volume titled Bread and Roses. It was awarded the Evelyn Richardson Memorial Literary Award in 1997.

A vocal opponent of pornography, Inglis was concerned that material she had seen as "innocent titillation" in the 1950s had become disturbingly graphic by the 1980s.

Honours
Inglis was honoured with a Governor General's Persons Award and a doctor of laws degree from Memorial University.

Personal life
She was married to Gordon Inglis and died in Vancouver on 22 May 2013.

References

External links
Dorothy Inglis papers at Queen Elizabeth II Library, Memorial University of Newfoundland

1926 births
2013 deaths
20th-century Canadian writers
20th-century Canadian women writers
Canadian columnists
Canadian women columnists
Canadian feminist writers
Canadian feminists
Activists from Alberta
Activists from British Columbia
Activists from Newfoundland and Labrador
Writers from Calgary
Writers from St. John's, Newfoundland and Labrador
Writers from Vancouver
Governor General's Award in Commemoration of the Persons Case winners